The Mosopelea, or Ofo, were a Siouan-speaking Native American people who historically lived near the upper Ohio River. In reaction to Iroquois Confederacy invasions to take control of hunting grounds in the late 17th century, they moved south to the lower Mississippi River. They finally settled in central Louisiana, where they assimilated with the Tunica and the Siouan-speaking Biloxi. They spoke the Ofo language, generally classified as a Siouan language.

History
According to the 1684 French map of Jean-Baptiste-Louis Franquelin, the Mosopelea had eight villages just north of the Ohio River, between the Muskingum and Scioto rivers, within the present-day state of Ohio, corresponding with the heart of Ohio Hopewell country.  (The Miami-Illinois name  ("river of the Mosopelea") referred to what is now called the Ohio River. Shortened in the Shawnee language, the name evolved to "Pelisipi" or "Pellissippi" and was also later applied to what is now called the Clinch River in Virginia and Tennessee.)

Franquelin noted the villages on the map as "destroyed". La Salle recorded that the Mosopelea were among the tribes conquered by the Seneca and other nations of the Iroquois Confederacy in the early 1670s, during the later Beaver Wars. In 1673, Marquette, Joliet, and other early French explorers found that the Mosopelea likely abandoned Ohio and moved south along the Mississippi River. They briefly lived with the Quapaw before joining the Tunica, who were allied with the French colonists.

In 1699, the Ofo/Mosopelea were referred by French Jesuits as the Houspé, and were encountered living among the Tunica.

Around 1700, French travelers reported Ofo villages in Mississippi on the Yazoo River. Refusing to join the Natchez in their war against the French in the 1710s and 1720s, the Ofo moved further south. They and other remnant peoples became assimilated into the Biloxi and Tunica. Their language became extinct.

Today their descendants are enrolled in the federally recognized Tunica-Biloxi Indian Tribe and have a reservation in Avoyelles Parish, Louisiana. They speak English or French as their first language.

Notes

References
 Hanna, Charles. The Wilderness Trail, Vol 2, pp. 94–105.

External links 
 Tunica-Biloxi Indian Tribe, official website

Siouan peoples
Native American tribes in Ohio
Native American tribes in Louisiana